Xiangmei North station is a station of Shenzhen Metro Line 2. It opened on 28 June 2011. It is located in the north-west side of the cross between Qiaoxiang Road and Xiangmei Road.

Station layout

Exits

References

External links
 Shenzhen Metro Xiangmei North Station (Chinese)
 Shenzhen Metro Xiangmei North Station (English)

Shenzhen Metro stations
Railway stations in Guangdong
Futian District
Railway stations in China opened in 2011